The women's tournament of water polo at the 2020 Summer Olympics at Tokyo, Japan was played from 24 July to 7 August 2021 at the Tokyo Tatsumi International Swimming Center. It was the sixth appearance of the women's tournament, which had been held consecutively since 2000.

On 24 March 2020, the Olympics were postponed to 2021 due to the COVID-19 pandemic. Because of the pandemic, the games were played behind closed doors.

The United States won their third consecutive and overall gold medal after a finals win over Spain, while Hungary captured the bronze medal, beating defending bronze medalists Russia.

The medals for the competition were presented by Samira Asghari, Afghanistan; IOC Member, and the medalists' bouquets were presented by Dale Neuburger, United States; FINA Treasurer.

Qualification

Schedule
The competition began on 24 July, and matches were held every other day. At each match time, two matches were played simultaneously (two during the preliminary round, two quarterfinals during that round, one main semifinal and one classification semifinal during the semifinal round, and the two classification games on the final day) except for the bronze and gold medal matches.

Competition format
The ten teams were seeded into two groups for a preliminary round and each group was played in a round-robin. The top four teams in each group advanced to the knockout round while the fifth placed teams and those ranked 9th and 10th based on win–loss record then goal average were eliminated. The knockout round began with quarterfinals, with the winners advanced to the semifinals, while the quarterfinal losers play in the fifth to eighth place classification semifinals. The two semifinal winners play in the gold medal match, while the two semifinal losers play in the bronze medal match.

Draw
The draw took place on 21 February 2021 in Rotterdam, The Netherlands.

Seeding
The ten teams in the women's tournament were drawn into two groups of five teams. The teams were seeded into five pots.

Final draw
The hosts Japan and the reigning Olympic champion the United States were both drawn into Group B.

Referees
The following 28 referees were selected for the tournament.

24 referees:

  Germán Moller
  Nicola Johnson
  Marie-Claude Deslières
  Zhang Liang
  Nenad Periš
  Sébastien Dervieux
  Frank Ohme
  Georgios Stavridis
  György Kun
  Alessandro Severo
  Asumi Tsuzaki
  Viktor Salnichenko
  Stanko Ivanovski
  Michiel Zwart
  John Waldow
  Adrian Alexandrescu
  Arkadiy Voevodin
  Vojin Putniković
  Jeremy Cheng
  Dion Willis
  Xevi Buch
  Ursula Wengenroth
  Michael Goldenberg
  Daniel Daners

4 video assistant referees:

  Mladen Rak
  Alexandr Margolin
  Alexandr Shershnev
  Jaume Teixido

Group stage
The schedule was announced on 9 March 2021.

All times are local (UTC+9).

Group A

Group B

Knockout stage

Bracket

5th place bracket

Quarterfinals

5–8th place semifinals

Semifinals

Seventh place game

Fifth place game

Bronze medal game

Gold medal game

Final ranking

Medalists

Team statistics

Goals for

Source: Official Results Book (page 224)

Goals against

Source: Official Results Book (pages 239, 243, 247, 251, 255, 258, 262, 266, 269, 273)

Goal difference

Source: Official Results Book (pages 239, 243, 247, 251, 255, 258, 262, 266, 269, 273)

Saves

Source: Official Results Book (pages 239, 243, 247, 251, 255, 258, 262, 266, 269, 273)

Blocks

Source: Official Results Book (page 224)

Rebounds

Source: Official Results Book (page 224)

Steals

Source: Official Results Book (page 224)

Sprints won

Source: Official Results Book (page 224)

Turnovers

Source: Official Results Book (page 224)

Exclusions with substitution

Source: Official Results Book (page 224)

Player statistics

Multiple medalists

Three-time Olympic medalist(s): 2 players
 : Melissa Seidemann, Maggie Steffens

Leading goalscorers

Source: Official Results Book (page 234)

Saves leaders

Source: Official Results Book (page 236)

Leading blockers

Source: Official Results Book (pages 239, 243, 247, 251, 255, 258, 262, 266, 269, 273)

Leading rebounders

Source: Official Results Book (pages 239, 243, 247, 251, 255, 258, 262, 266, 269, 273)

Steals leaders

Source: Official Results Book (pages 239, 243, 247, 251, 255, 258, 262, 266, 269, 273)

Leading sprinters

Source: Official Results Book (page 233)

Turnovers leaders

Source: Official Results Book (pages 239, 243, 247, 251, 255, 258, 262, 266, 269, 273)

Exclusions leaders

Source: Official Results Book (pages 239, 243, 247, 251, 255, 258, 262, 266, 269, 273)

Awards
The women's all-star team was announced on 7 August 2021.

References

Sources

Overall
 Water Polo – Olympic Schedule & Results | Tokyo 2020 Olympics 
 Water Polo – Olympic Reports | Tokyo 2020 Olympics
 Water Polo – Official Results Book | Tokyo 2020 Olympics (archive)
 Water Polo – Tournament Summary | Tokyo 2020 Olympics 
 Water Polo – Competition Officials | Tokyo 2020 Olympics

Tournament details
 Water Polo – Competition Schedule | Tokyo 2020 Olympics

Statistics
 Water Polo – Overall Team Statistics | Tokyo 2020 Olympics
 Water Polo – Team Statistics | Tokyo 2020 Olympics
 Water Polo – Individual Statistics | Tokyo 2020 Olympics
 Water Polo – Individual Statistics - Leading Scorers | Tokyo 2020 Olympics
 Water Polo – Goalkeeper Statistics | Tokyo 2020 Olympics
 Water Polo – Cumulative Statistics | Tokyo 2020 Olympics
 Australia, Canada, China, Hungary, Japan, Netherlands, ROC, South Africa, Spain, United States

Medallists and victory ceremony presenters
 Water Polo – Medallists | Tokyo 2020 Olympics 
 Water Polo – Victory Ceremony Presenters | Tokyo 2020 Olympics

External links
 Water Polo | Tokyo 2020 Olympics 
 Tokyo 2020 | FINA

Women's tournament
Women's events at the 2020 Summer Olympics